Wu Peng (born May 16, 1987 in Hangzhou, Zhejiang) is a Chinese  swimmer. He has concentrated on the butterfly since the 10th National Games in 2005.

Early life and career
Wu's parents first sent him to the pool when he was four years old as an exercise for weight-loss.

He first decided to dedicate himself to swimming while watching swimming in the 1996 Olympics; the best result for Chinese men's swimming was 4th place in 50m freestyle, while Chinese women's swimming got gold. Wu said to his father that he wanted to be the first Chinese man to stand on the podium for Olympic swimming.

Wu's father died of a heart attack in 2003 while meeting Wu to bring him home for the weekend after practice.

Career
He had excellent times at the National Games and Asian Games. In fact, he has brought hope to China's swim team since first joining it. He was one of the youngest swimmers on the team when he joined.

At the 2004 Athens Olympics, when he was only 17, Wu Peng made the 200 m butterfly final and became the only Chinese swimmer to finish in the top eight at the games. It was only Wu's first Olympics, and the team was satisfied with his performance.

At the 2006 short course World Championships in Shanghai, Wu won the 200 m butterfly in a championships record. He also won the bronze medal at the 2005 World Long Course Championships in Montreal, and the silver behind Michael Phelps at the 2007 World Long Course Championships in Melbourne, both times at 200 m butterfly. At the Beijing Olympics, he carried the nation's hopes for a breakthrough in swimming. Although making it to the finals, he managed a joint fourth with the New Zealand swimmer Moss Burmester.

He suffered an injury in 2009 and could not make it to the World Long Course Championships to try for the podium once again.

Wu himself has said that if he were to medal in the London 2012 Olympics, he would consider his career to have been full and satisfying.

Wu Peng defeated Michael Phelps in the 200 fly in consecutive events, at the Michigan Grand Prix and Charlotte UltraSwim, in 2012 ending Michael Phelps' streak of 60 wins in nearly 9 years.

Major achievements
2002 Asian Games: First, men's 200 m backstroke, 200 m butterfly and 400 m individual medley
2004 Olympics – Finalist, 200m butterfly
2004 National Swimming Championship & Olympic Trial – First, men's 400 m individual medley and 200 m butterfly
2005 National Swimming Championship & National Games Qualifiers – First, men's 400 m individual medley
2005 World Championships – bronze, men's 200m butterfly
2005 East Asian Games – First, 400 IM; Second, 200 fly
2006 Short Course Worlds – First, men's 200 m butterfly
2007 World Championships – silver, men's 200m butterfly
2008 Olympics – Finalist (fourth-place finish), 200m butterfly
2011 World Aquatics Championships – Bronze, 200m butterfly

References

 Wu Peng
 Men's 200 m Butterfly Final , 2008 Summer Olympics

1987 births
Living people
Chinese male medley swimmers
Chinese male butterfly swimmers
Swimmers from Zhejiang
Olympic swimmers of China
Sportspeople from Hangzhou
Swimmers at the 2004 Summer Olympics
Swimmers at the 2008 Summer Olympics
Swimmers at the 2012 Summer Olympics
World Aquatics Championships medalists in swimming
Asian Games medalists in swimming
Swimmers at the 2002 Asian Games
Swimmers at the 2006 Asian Games
Swimmers at the 2010 Asian Games
Asian Games gold medalists for China
Asian Games silver medalists for China
Asian Games bronze medalists for China
Medalists at the 2002 Asian Games
Medalists at the 2006 Asian Games
Medalists at the 2010 Asian Games
20th-century Chinese people
21st-century Chinese people